The 1957–58 Hovedserien was the 14th completed season of top division football in Norway.

Overview
It was contested by 16 teams, and Viking won the championship, their first league title.

Teams and locations
Note: Table lists in alphabetical order.

League tables

Group A

Group B

Results

Group A

Group B

Championship final
Viking 2–0 Skeid

References
Norway - List of final tables (RSSSF)

Eliteserien seasons
Norway
1
1